This page presents the albums and singles discography of Filipino multi-awarded singer, recording artist, composer, and arranger, Gary Valenciano.

Studio albums

Live albums

Compilation albums

Collaboration albums
 Salubungin Ang Pasko (Universal Records, 1982)
 Ginintuang Diwa ng Pasko (Universal Records, 1989)
 18 Classic OPM Love Songs (PolyEast Records Philippines, 1998)
 The Best Of Crossover Presents (Viva Records, 2003)
 Only Selfless Love 2 (Universal Records, 2003)
 OPM Rewind (Universal Records, 2004)
 The Love Song Collection (Universal Records, 2004)
 Top Male OPM Hits (Star Music, 2004)
 Various Movie Themes (Vicor Music, 2005)
 Nagmamahal Kapamilya Songs For Global (Star Records, 2005)
 Best Of OPM Inspirational Songs (Universal Records, 2005)
 Best Of OPM Love Duets (Universal Records, 2005)
 Best Of OPM Love Ballads (Universal Records, 2005)
 Best Of OPM Movie & TV Themes (Universal Records, 2005)
 Pinoy Biggie Hits (Star Music, 2006)
 OPM With Love (Universal Records, 2006)
 Lovestruck Vol. 1 (Viva Records, 2006)
 OPM Gold (Universal Records, 2006)
 OPM Superstars Christmas (Universal Records, 2006)
 Hotsilog The ASAP Hotdog Compilation (Star Music, 2006)
 Top Male OPM Hits (Star Music, 2007)
 Pinoy Biggie Hits Rewind (Star Music, 2007)
 Musika At Pelikula: A Star Cinema Music Collection (Star Music, 2008)
 No.1 Signature Hits OPM's Best (Vicor Music, 2008)
 Kris Aquino: The Greatest Love (Universal Records, 2008)
 Wings of the Soul (Star Music, 2008)
 OPM No. 1's (Star Music, 2009)
 I-Star 15: Best Of TV & Movie Themes (Star Music, 2010)
 60 Taon Ng Musika At Soap Opera (Star Music, 2010)
 OPM All-Star Christmas (Universal Records, 2010)
 Ngayong Pasko Magniningning Ang Pilipino (Star Music, 2010)
 OPM Number 1s Vol.2 (Star Music, 2011)
 I Love You (Star Music, 2011)
 Bida Best Hits Da Best (Star Music, 2011)
 Magsama Tayo Sa Kwento Ng Pasko (Star Music, 2013)

Popular songs in chronological order
Valenciano's songs include:

  1983 – Growing Up (Theme Song of the Philippine Movie "Bagets", also covered by Mulatto Band in 1995 for the movie TGIS: The Movie.)
  1983 – You Got Me Working
  1983 – After All
  1983 – Hang On
  1983 – Fool Till The End
  1983 – Betty's In Bed
  1984 – Love Of Mine
  1984 – Reaching Out (theme song of ABC 5, formerly The 5 Network or 5 and currently reverted back to TV5 from 1996 to 1999)
  1984 – Hotshots
  1985 – Move Your Body
  1985 – Once Upon A Life
  1986 – Paano
  1986 - Pasko Na Sinta Ko
  1987 – 'Di Bale Na Lang
  1987 – 'Wag Mo Na Sanang Isipin
  1987 – 'Di Na Natuto
  1987 - Sana Maulit Muli
  1988 – Take Me Out Of The Dark
  1989 – Eto Na Naman
  1989 – Laughter All The Time
  1989 – Each Passing Night (with Regine Velasquez)
  1989 – Narito
  1989 – Letting Go
  1989 – Mahal Na Mahal Ko Siya
  1990 – Natutulog Ba Ang Diyos?
  1990 – Look In Her Eyes
  1991 – Shout For Joy
  1991 – Could You Be Messiah?
  1991 - Sa Tuwing Naaalala Ka (with Sharon Cuneta)
  1992 – Gaya Ng Dati
  1993 – Hataw Na 
  1993 - Sa Yahweh
  1993 – Muli (with Regine Velasquez)
  1994 – Babalik Ka Rin
  1995 – Hele Ni Inay
  1997 – Until Then
  1998 – (Everybody) Get Down
  1998 - Pampanga
  1999 – More And More
  2000 – I Will Be Here [remake of an original song by Steven Curtis Chapman]
  2001 – The Warrior Is A Child [remake of an original song by Twila Paris]
  2002 – Can We Just Stop And Talk Awhile (with Kyla) [remake of an original song by Jose Mari Chan]
  2002 – Kung Mawawala Ka (with Zsa Zsa Padilla)
 2003 -   Anak [remake of an original song by Freddie Aguilar]
  2003 – Kailangan Kita

  2004 – How Did You Know [remake of an original song by Chiqui Pineda]
  2005 – Ikaw Lamang [theme song from the movie Dubai]
  2005 – Break Me
  2006 – Wait Forever
  2007 – You Are (with Joni Villanueva)
  2008 – Only Hope [remake of an original song by Switchfoot]
  2008 – Ilaan Mo (Theme from ICare Compassion Ministry)
  2009 – Tayong Dalawa [remake of an original song by Rey Valera]
  2009 – Ayt! (with Sponge Cola)
  2009 – And I Love You So [remake of an original song by Don McLean]
  2010 – Kung Tayo'y Magkakalayo [remake of an original song by Rey Valera]
  2010 – How Can I? {remake of an original song by Martin Nievera}
  2010 - Did It Ever
  2011 - Minsan Lang Kitang Iibigin [remake of an original song by Ariel Rivera]
  2011 - (Where Do I Begin?) Love Story [remake of an original song by Andy Williams], [theme music from the movie In The Name Of Love]
  2011 - Home
  2011 - Wanted Sa Radyo
  2012 - Hanggang Sa Dulo Ng Walang Hanggan [remake of an original song by Basil Valdez]
  2013 - Kailangan Ko'y Ikaw [remake of an original song by Regine Velasquez]
  2013 - Huwag Ka Lang Mawawala [remake of an original song by Ogie Alcasid]
  2013 - Pananagutan  [theme song from the teleserye Honesto]
  2014 - Ikaw Lamang [theme song from the teleserye Ikaw Lamang, remake of an original song by Ogie Alcasid]
  2014 - SayTay "Hey Madlang People"
  2015 - Wag Ka Nang Umiyak [remake of an original song by Sugarfree, theme song from the teleserye FPJ's Ang Probinsyano]
  2016 - Maalaala Mo Kaya (remake of an original song by Dulce)
  2016 - I'll Never Love This Way Again [remake of an original song by Dionne Warwick, theme song from the movie Barcelona: A Love Untold]
  2018 - Anong Nangyari Sa Ating Dalawa [remake of an original song by Aiza Seguerra, theme song from the teleserye FPJ's Ang Probinsyano]
  2018 - Ililigtas Ka Niya [theme song from the teleserye FPJ's Ang Probinsyano]
  2023 - Kapalaran (covered version from the late original singer Rico J. Puno & also used as a theme song from the action series FPJ's Batang Quiapo)

Music videos

Bettys In Bed (Gary V's 1st music video, 1983, aired exclusively on MYX Channel in 2019)
Mahal Na Mahal Ko Siya (1989, available on YouTube) 
Babalik Ka Rin (1992)
These Eyes (1995)
Until Then (1997)
After All (1997)
I Will Be Here (2000)
The Warrior Is A Child (2000)
Lupa (2000)
Anak (2002)
Can We Just Stop And Talk Awhile (2003, featuring Kyla) 
Break Me (2005, tribute to the late Bella Tan)
Ikaw Lamang (2005)
Wait Forever (2007)
Only Hope (2008)
Tayong Dalawa (2009)
Did It Ever (2010)
Walang Hanggang (2012)
Pananagutan (2013)
Saytay "Hey Madlang People" (2014)
Wag Ka Nang Umiyak (2015, theme from FPJ's Ang Probinsyano)
Ililigtas Ka Niya (2018, theme from FPJ's Ang Probinsyano)
Kunin Mo Na Ang Lahat Sa Akin (2020, theme from FPJ's Ang Probinsyano)

Notes

References

Discographies of Filipino artists